Hugh Dillman McGaughy (February 8, 1885 – July 7, 1956) was an American Broadway and silent film actor. Dillman served as a Navy recruiter during World War I.  His first marriage was to actress Marjorie Rambeau in 1919. They divorced in 1923. 

Dillman later sold real estate in Palm Beach, Florida and was one of the founding members of the Society of the Four Arts. He was the sales agent for Mrs. Dodge purchase of the  largest house in Palm Beach, Addison Mizner’s Playa Rienta.

In 1926 he and Mrs. Anna Thompson Dodge, who was 19 years his senior  and  heiress of the Dodge Automobile fortune, were married. They divorced in 1947. Hugh continued to run a real estate business and orchard nursery in Palm Beach, and the family lived at the former Bush mansion in Marble Cliff at 1550 Roxbury Road near Columbus, Ohio.

References

External links

American male silent film actors
20th-century American male actors
American male stage actors
American real estate brokers
Male actors from Ohio
1885 births
1956 deaths
People from Morrow County, Ohio